Robert Thore Nystrom (born October 10, 1952) is a Swedish-Canadian former professional ice hockey right winger. He played for the New York Islanders of the National Hockey League (NHL) from 1972–86. He is best remembered as having scored the winning goal at the 7:11 mark of overtime to give the New York Islanders the 1980 Stanley Cup title. This signaled the first of four straight championships for the club. He was also among the last NHL players to not wear a helmet during a game.

Playing his minor hockey in Hinton, Alberta, Nystrom is immortalized on the town's wall of fame. He is arguably the most successful NHL player from the geographical area that yielded the likes of Dave Scatchard and Dean McAmmond.

His son Eric last played professional hockey for Norway’s Stavanger Oilers, and previously played for the Nashville Predators, Calgary Flames, Minnesota Wild, and Dallas Stars of the NHL.

Early career
Born Thore Robert Nyström in Stockholm, Sweden, Nystrom moved to Hinton, Alberta as a four-year-old and later starred for the BCJHL's Kamloops Rockets in 1969–70. He was an emotional sparkplug on the Calgary Centennials of the WCJHL for two seasons, and was claimed 33rd overall by the Islanders in 1972. He played half a season for minor league affiliate New Haven Nighthawks of the American Hockey League before being promoted to the Islanders in March 1973, wearing number 5.

Nystrom's first full season with the Islanders was 1973–74, when he tallied 41 points as a rookie, garnering Calder Memorial Trophy consideration as rookie of the year (the award eventually went to teammate Denis Potvin). As Potvin now used number 5, Nystrom wore number 23.

Over the next four seasons, as the Islander team improved, Nystrom became one of the steadiest two-way forwards in the league. In each of his first five seasons he collected over 20 goals, including a career-high 30 in 1977–78, while playing a strong checking and defensive game as well. He was also selected to play in the 1977 NHL All-Star Game.

Stanley Cups and "Mr. Islander"
Nystrom was one of the hardest working, if not the most talented, members of the New York Islanders, who were quickly becoming one of the most feared and respected clubs in the NHL. Although Nystrom, who was nicknamed "Thor" by his teammates, had developed into a very skilled and respected fighter with a physical edge to his game, Nystrom took it upon himself to improve his skating ability. He regularly took power skating classes, including training with pioneering instructor Laura Stamm and in time, became a fairly fluid skater with strong hockey instincts.

As with many of the Islanders of the early 1980s, those instincts seemed to be more in tune when the playoffs rolled around. Nystrom has been known as one of the all-time clutch players in NHL Stanley Cup playoff history. He tallied 39 goals and 83 points in 157 playoff games; however he is most noted for his knack for sudden death overtime winners. Nystrom ended playoff overtime games four times in his career. On May 24, 1980, in game six of the Stanley Cup finals against the Philadelphia Flyers, Nystrom scored the game winner at 7:11 of overtime on an assist from John Tonelli to secure the first Stanley Cup in franchise history.

Nystrom was part of the first NHL team (1979–80 New York Islanders) to win a Stanley Cup with Europeans on its roster. Nystrom is still able to speak a little Swedish, and he was invited to play for Sweden in the 1981 Canada Cup. He was however forced to decline as he had not yet negotiated a new contract with the Islanders and hence did not want to risk injury.

Nystrom embraced the Long Island community, contributing to various charities in the area and promoting the local businesses whenever possible. By virtue of these distinctions, and coupled with the most famous goal in team history, Nystrom was nicknamed "Mr. Islander".

Later years
Nystrom continued to be an effective winger through the Islanders' Stanley Cup run, but by 1985, his rugged, aggressive play began to wear his body down. He played only 36 games in 1984–85, managing only two goals, though he matched that total in only ten postseason games.

After playing sparingly through the first three months of the 1985–86 season, Nystrom was accidentally struck in the eye by a high stick from teammate Gerald Diduck in practice on January 5. Unable to play due to the severity of the injury (he suffered two tears of the retina, which nearly cost him his eye and later required surgery), he was thought to have retired, and he served as an assistant coach for the remainder of the season.

Nystrom had played in 899 regular season games at the time. The Islanders' coach, Al Arbour, who considered Nystrom one of his favorites, approached Nystrom prior to the Islanders' last home game of the 1985–86 season on April 5, and asked him if he would like to dress one more game, in order to make it an even 900 games played and to give Islanders fans a chance to say a proper good-bye. Nystrom accepted, and was added to the starting lineup. He took the opening face-off to a surprised and appreciative home crowd's roar. After skating around for about five seconds, he returned to the bench, never to play again.

Nystrom remained an assistant coach the next two seasons, then served as radio analyst for the Islanders. He was named Islanders director of corporate affairs in 1988 and remained in that position through 1988–89 season, when he took a position as Islanders director of special projects in 1989 and remained in that position through 1990–91 season. He was named Islanders director of community relations in 1991 and director of amateur hockey development and alumni relations in 1992. In 1997 he added the title director of corporate relations and remained in that position through 2001–02 season.

The Islanders retired his No. 23 on April 1, 1995, although three other players had worn it after Nystrom.

In 2003, he was inducted into the Nassau County Sports Hall of Fame. He is also a member of the National Jewish Sports Hall of Fame. He received the George Young Award, given to that individual, Jewish or non-Jewish, who has best exemplified the high ideals that George Young displayed, from the U.S. National Jewish Sports Hall of Fame and Museum in 2003.

Personal life
A resident of Syosset, New York, Nystrom has two children—Marissa and Eric, who was drafted by the Calgary Flames as the number ten pick in the first round of the 2002 NHL Draft. He most recently played for the Nashville Predators. Eric Nystrom is Jewish as is his mother.

Bob Nystrom Award
In 1991, the Islanders began presenting the Bob Nystrom Award to the player on the team "who best exemplifies leadership, hustle, and dedication". Past winners:

1991 – Brent Sutter
1992 – Ray Ferraro
1993 – Benoit Hogue
1994 – Steve Thomas
1996 – Dan Plante
1997 – Claude Lapointe
1998 – Rich Pilon
1999 – Claude Lapointe
2000 – Claude Lapointe
2001 – Dave Scatchard
2002 – Steve Webb
2003 – Jason Blake, Garth Snow
2004 – Adrian Aucoin
2005 – No winner due to NHL lockout
2006 – Kevin Colley
2007 – Trent Hunter
2008 – Richard Park
2009 – Tim Jackman
2010 – Kyle Okposo
2011 – Frans Nielsen
2012 – Matt Martin
2013 – Matt Martin
2014 – Matt Martin
2015 - Matt Martin
2016 – Matt Martin
2017 – Anders Lee
2018 – Casey Cizikas
2019 – Casey Cizikas
2020 – Matt Martin
2021 - Jean-Gabriel Pageau

Career statistics

Regular season and playoffs

References

External links
 

1952 births
Living people
Calgary Centennials players
Canadian ice hockey coaches
Canadian ice hockey left wingers
National Hockey League players with retired numbers
Naturalized citizens of Canada
New York Islanders coaches
New York Islanders draft picks
New York Islanders players
People from Yellowhead County
Ice hockey people from Stockholm
Stanley Cup champions
Swedish emigrants to Canada